Rhizosmilodon is an extinct genus of saber-tooth cat of the subfamily Machairodontinae that lived during the Early Pliocene and was discovered in the U.S. state of Florida. Comparable in size to a medium-sized modern jaguar at about 165 lb. in weight, fossils of Rhizosmilodon are known only from Florida. The best specimens for this species are its lower jaw and teeth, which carry intermediate characteristics between advanced forms such as Smilodon and primitive forms such as Paramachairodus. It was likely an ambush predator, preying on animals such as deer, tapirs and horses.

Phylogeny

Phylogenetic relationships of Rhizosmilodon with other Machairodonts based on analysis of 37 cranio-mandibular characters.

References

Smilodontini
Extinct mammals of North America
Fossil taxa described in 2013
Prehistoric carnivoran genera